Kasumpati, also called Kasumpti, is a village in Shimla District in the Indian state of Himachal Pradesh.

Geography

Climate 

Kasumpati has a cool and moderate climate. Between December and March, the village gets heavy snow and the temperature can hover around freezing point. During the summer, the climate is warmer with temperatures around thirty degrees Celsius.

Politics
Rana Anirudh Singh (born 27 January 1977) is the present Member of Legislative Assembly (MLA) from Kasumpti, Shimla, Himachal Pradesh since 2012 to 2017.

 Temp in Winter: to 
 Temp in Summer: to

References

Villages in Shimla district